"Deeper Shade of Soul" is the debut single by Dutch band Urban Dance Squad. It was taken from their debut album Mental Floss for the Globe and samples the Ray Barretto song he recorded in 1968 with a similar name ("A Deeper Shade of Soul"). Originally released in 1990, the single reached number 21 on the Billboard Hot 100 in March 1991 and stayed on the charts for 18 weeks. In the United States it is the song for which the band is best known, being their only hit single.

Track listing
 "Deeper Shade of Soul" – 4:28
 "Man on the Corner" – 3:38

Charts

References

External links
 
 

1990 singles
1990 songs
Arista Records singles
Ariola Records singles
Urban Dance Squad songs